French Creek is a stream in the U.S. state of West Virginia. It is a tributary of the Buckhannon River.

French Creek most likely was named for the fact French explorers visited the area in the 18th century.

See also
List of rivers of West Virginia

References

Rivers of Upshur County, West Virginia
Rivers of West Virginia